Maryang is located in Gangjin county, South Jeolla province, South Korea.  It is one of ten myeon in Gangjin county, and it is notable for commercial and recreational fishing.

Maryang was designated a myeon on April 1, 1989.  At the end of December 2009, its population was 2,202 people in 1,034 households, down from 2,436 people in 1,009 households in 2003.

External links
From Gangjin's official website:
 General information on Maryang-myeon
 Maryang port
 Pages in Korean with more and newer data

Gangjin County
Towns and townships in South Jeolla Province